British Airways Flight 5390 was a flight from Birmingham Airport in England for Málaga Airport in Spain. On 10 June 1990, the BAC One-Eleven 528FL suffered explosive decompression resulting in no loss of life. While the aircraft was flying over Didcot, Oxfordshire, an improperly installed windscreen panel separated from its frame causing the captain to be sucked out of the aircraft. The captain was held in place through the window frame for twenty minutes until the first officer landed at Southampton Airport.

Aircraft and crew 
The County of South Glamorgan was a BAC One-Eleven Series 528FL jet airliner, registered as  The aircraft first flew on 8 February 1971, and was delivered to Bavaria Fluggesellschaft on 26 February 1971. It was later transferred to Bavaria Germanair in 1977, Hapag-Lloyd Flug in 1979, British Caledonian in 1981, and finally to British Airways in 1988. The captain was 42-year-old Timothy Lancaster, who had logged 11,050 flight hours, including 1,075 hours on the BAC One-Eleven; the copilot was 39-year-old Alastair Atchison, with 7,500 flight hours, with 1,100 of them on the BAC One-Eleven. The aircraft also carried 4 cabin crew and 81 passengers.

Incident 
Atchison handled a routine take-off at 08:20 local time (07:20 UTC) then handed control to Lancaster as the plane continued to climb. Both pilots released their shoulder harnesses and Lancaster loosened his lap belt.

Flight attendant Nigel Ogden was entering the cockpit when there was a loud bang and the cabin quickly filled with condensation. The left windscreen panel, on Lancaster's side of the flight deck, had separated from the forward fuselage; Lancaster was propelled out of his seat by the rushing air from the decompression and forced head first out of the flight deck. His knees were caught on the flight controls and his upper torso remained outside the aircraft, exposed to extreme wind and cold. The autopilot had disengaged, causing the plane to descend rapidly. The flight deck door was blown inward onto the control console, blocking the throttle control (causing the aircraft to gain speed as it descended), flight documents and check lists were sucked out of the cockpit and debris blew in from the passenger cabin. Ogden rushed to grab Lancaster's belt, while the other two flight attendants secured loose objects, reassured passengers, and instructed them to adopt brace positions in anticipation of an emergency landing.

The plane was not equipped with oxygen for everyone on board, so Atchison began a rapid emergency descent to reach an altitude with sufficient air pressure. He then re-engaged the autopilot and broadcast a distress call, but he was unable to hear the response from air traffic control because of wind noise; the difficulty in establishing two-way communication led to a delay in initiation of emergency procedures.

Ogden, still holding on to Lancaster, was by now becoming exhausted, so purser John Heward and flight attendant Simon Rogers took over the task of holding on to the captain. By this time Lancaster had shifted several centimetres farther outside and his head was repeatedly striking the side of the fuselage. The crew believed him to be dead, but Atchison told the others to continue holding onto him, out of fear that letting go of him might cause him to strike the left wing, engine, or horizontal stabiliser, potentially damaging it.

Eventually, Atchison was able to hear the clearance from air traffic control to make an emergency landing at Southampton Airport. The flight attendants managed to free Lancaster's ankles from the flight controls while still keeping hold of him. At 08:55 local time (07:55 UTC), the aircraft landed at Southampton and the passengers disembarked using boarding steps.

Lancaster survived with frostbite, bruising, shock, and fractures to his right arm, left thumb, and right wrist. Ogden had cuts and bruises to his arm, and later suffered from PTSD. There were no other injuries.

Investigation 

Police found the windscreen panel and many of the 90 bolts securing it near Cholsey, Oxfordshire. Investigators found that when the windscreen was installed 27 hours before the flight, 84 of the bolts used were  too small in diameter (British Standards A211-8C vs A211-8D, which are #8–32 vs #10–32 by the Unified Thread Standard) and the remaining six were A211-7D, which is the correct diameter but  too short (0.7 inch vs. 0.8 inch). The previous windscreen had also been fitted using incorrect bolts, which were replaced by the shift maintenance manager on a like-for-like basis without reference to maintenance documentation, as the plane was due to depart shortly. The undersized bolts were unable to withstand the air pressure difference between the cabin and the outside atmosphere during flight.
(The windscreen was not of the "plug" type – fitted from the inside so that cabin pressure helps to hold it in place – but of the type fitted from the outside so that cabin pressure tends to dislodge it.)

Investigators found that the shift maintenance manager responsible for installing the incorrect bolts had failed to follow British Airways policies. They recommended that the CAA recognise the need for aircraft engineering personnel to wear corrective glasses if prescribed. They also faulted the policies themselves, which should have required testing or verification by another individual for this critical task. Finally, they found the local Birmingham Airport management responsible for not directly monitoring the shift maintenance manager's working practices.

Awards 
First Officer Alastair Atchison and cabin crew members Susan Gibbins and Nigel Ogden were awarded the Queen's Commendation for Valuable Service in the Air; Ogden's name was erroneously missed from the published supplement. Atchison was also awarded a 1992 Polaris Award for outstanding airmanship.

Aftermath 
The aircraft was repaired and returned to service, eventually being sold to Jaro International in 1993. It continued to operate with them until Jaro ceased operations in 2001; the aircraft was scrapped in 2002.

Tim Lancaster returned to work after less than five months. He left British Airways in 2003 and flew with EasyJet until he retired from commercial piloting in 2008.

Alastair Atchison left British Airways shortly after the incident and joined Channel Express, remaining there after it was rebranded as Jet2 until he made his last commercial flight on a Boeing 737-33A (registration: G-CELE) from Alicante to Manchester on his 65th birthday on 28 June 2015.

In popular culture
The accident was featured on season 2 of the Canadian documentary series Mayday. The episode is entitled "Blow Out".

See also 
Sichuan Airlines Flight 8633, a similar incident
Southwest Airlines Flight 1380, an explosive decompression incident following an uncontained engine failure that resulted in a passenger being partially sucked out of a window; the passenger later died from her injuries

References

External links 

Air Accident Investigation Branch
Report No: 1/1992. Report on the accident to BAC One-Eleven, G-BJRT, over Didcot, Oxfordshire on 10 June 1990
 Final report
Transcript of Air Traffic Control communications during the incident (Archive)
Summary of the Final Report (Archive)
Database entry (Archive)
News article showing image of cockpit exterior after landing 

1990 in England
Airliner accidents and incidents caused by maintenance errors
Aviation accidents and incidents in England
Aviation accidents and incidents in 1990
5390
Airliner accidents and incidents caused by in-flight structural failure
Airliner accidents and incidents involving in-flight depressurization
Accidents and incidents involving the BAC One-Eleven
June 1990 events in the United Kingdom
Airliner accidents and incidents in the United Kingdom
Airliner accidents and incidents caused by pilot incapacitation